Who Is To Blame is a utility that processes the warnings/errors from Microsoft Visual Studio and then uses the Subversion (SVN) Blame tool to generate a report of which software developer added/amended the line causing the warning/error. It is free software released under the GNU General Public License. It uses SVN and Microsoft .NET Framework 3.5.

See also 
 Subversion
 Microsoft Visual Studio

External links 
 

Apache Subversion
Windows-only free software